Elections to North Down Borough Council were held on 19 May 1993 on the same day as the other Northern Irish local government elections. The election used four district electoral areas to elect a total of 25 councillors.

Election results

Note: "Votes" are the first preference votes.

Districts summary

|- class="unsortable" align="centre"
!rowspan=2 align="left"|Ward
! % 
!Cllrs
! %
!Cllrs
! %
!Cllrs
! %
!Cllrs
! %
!Cllrs
! %
!Cllrs
!rowspan=2|TotalCllrs
|- class="unsortable" align="center"
!colspan=2 bgcolor="" | UUP
!colspan=2 bgcolor="" | Alliance
!colspan=2 bgcolor="" | Conservative
!colspan=2 bgcolor="" | DUP
!colspan=2 bgcolor="" | UPUP
!colspan=2 bgcolor="white"| Others
|-
|align="left"|Abbey
|15.5
|1
|15.5
|1
|9.3
|1
|20.6
|1
|bgcolor="#FFF2CE"|29.8
|bgcolor="#FFF2CE"|2
|9.3
|0
|6
|-
|align="left"|	Ballyholme and Groomsport
|19.0
|2
|18.0
|1
|9.8
|1
|14.1
|1
|0.0
|0
|bgcolor="#0077FF"|39.1
|bgcolor="#0077FF"|2
|7
|-
|align="left"|Bangor West
|20.5
|1
|bgcolor="#F6CB2F"|32.7
|bgcolor="#F6CB2F"|2
|12.9
|1
|18.8
|1
|0.0
|0
|15.1
|1
|7
|-
|align="left"|Holywood
|18.9
|1
|22.9
|1
|11.9
|1
|11.8
|0
|0.0
|0
|bgcolor="#DDDDDD"|34.5
|bgcolor="#DDDDDD"|2
|5
|- class="unsortable" class="sortbottom" style="background:#C9C9C9"
|align="left"| Total
|24.9
|6
|21.7
|5
|20.7
|4
|15.5
|4
|5.9
|2
|11.3
|3
|25
|-
|}

Districts results

Abbey

1989: 2 x UPUP, 1 x DUP, 1 x Alliance, 1 x UUP, 1 x Conservative
1993: 2 x UPUP, 1 x DUP, 1 x Alliance, 1 x UUP, 1 x Conservative
1989-1993 Change: No change

Ballyholme and Groomsport

1989: 2 x Conservative, 1 x UUP, 1 x Alliance, 1 x DUP, 1 x Independent Unionist
1993: 2 x UUP, 2 x Independent Unionist, 1 x Alliance, 1 x DUP, 1 x Conservative
1989-1993 Change: UUP and Independent Unionist gain from Conservative and due to the addition of one seat

Bangor West

1989: 2 x Conservative, 2 x UUP, 1 x Alliance, 1 x DUP, 1 x Independent
1993: 2 x Alliance, 2 x UUP, 1 x DUP, 1 x Conservative, 1 x Independent Unionist
1989-1993 Change: Alliance and Independent Unionist gain from Conservative and Independent

Holywood

1989: 1 x Alliance, 1 x Conservative, 1 x UUP, 1 x DUP, 1 x Independent
1993: 2 x Independent, 1 x Alliance, 1 x UUP, 1 x Conservative
1989-1993 Change: Independent gain from DUP

References

North Down Borough Council elections
North Down